Julia Olivia Budd (born July 4, 1983) is a Canadian kickboxer and mixed martial artist competing in the Women's Featherweight division of Professional Fighters League (PFL).  She has fought in MMA promotions Strikeforce and Invicta Fighting Championships and is the first and former Bellator Women's Featherweight world champion.

Martial arts training
Budd practiced Muay Thai for many years and later became the only woman to defeat American Gina Carano in Muay Thai competition. Her second and final loss in the ring came by Germaine de Randamie, after which Budd made the move to MMA. Her Muay Thai record is 10–2. She began training in MMA at the end of 2008 and avenged her loss to de Randamie when she defeated her via unanimous decision in a 2011 MMA bout.

Budd trains at the Gibson Kickboxing & Pankration Academy.

Mixed martial arts career

On , Budd faced Germaine de Randamie in a rematch under MMA rules at Strikeforce Challengers 16. She defeated de Randamie via unanimous decision.

Budd's final fight for Strikeforce came on  when she was submitted by Ronda Rousey at Strikeforce Challengers 20.

Invicta Fighting Championships
She defeated Nilsson via TKO in the first round.

She was originally scheduled to face Elaina Maxwell, but Maxwell sustained a concussion in training and Budd instead faced Danielle West. She defeated West via TKO in the first round.

On , Invicta FC announced that Gomes was injured and that Muxlow would now face Santos. Budd remained on the card and instead faced Mollie Estes. She won the fight via submission in the third round.

On , Budd faced Charmaine Tweet at Invicta FC 7. She won the fight via unanimous decision.

Bellator MMA
In August 2014, Budd signed with Bellator.

Budd was expected to make her promotional debut at Bellator 133 on February 13, 2015 versus Talita Nogueira. However, Nogueira pulled out of the fight due to a knee injury, so Budd instead faced Gabrielle Holloway. She won the fight via unanimous decision.

Budd was set to face former Strikeforce Women's Bantamweight Champion Marloes Coenen for the inaugural Bellator Woman's Featherweight Championship at Bellator 155, however Budd got injured and was replaced by Alexis Dufresne in a non-title fight bout.

Budd faced Arlene Blencowe at Bellator 162 on October 21, 2016. She won the fight by majority decision.

Budd faced Marloes Coenen for Bellator Inaugural Women's Featherweight World Championship at Bellator 174 on March 3, 2017. She stopped the veteran Coenen in the fourth round via strikes after securing the full mount position.

In her first title defense, Budd faced Arlene Blencowe in a rematch on December 1, 2017 at Bellator 189. She won the fight by split decision.

In her second title defense, Budd faced Talita Nogueira on July 13, 2018 at Bellator 202. She won the fight and successfully defended her title via TKO in the third round.

In April 2019, news surfaced that Budd had signed a new, four-fight contract with Bellator.

On the first bout of the new deal, Budd faced Olga Rubin on July 12, 2019 at Bellator 224. She won the bout in the first round, dropping Rubin with a body kick and then ground and pounding her to a TKO victory.

In her fourth title defense, Budd faced Cris Cyborg on January 25, 2020 at Bellator 238 in Inglewood, California. She lost the fight via technical knockout in round four.

Budd faced Jessy Miele on August 21, 2020 at Bellator 234. She won the bout via unanimous decision.

Budd was initially expected to face Shooto Brazil champion Dayana Silva at Bellator 256 on April 9, 2021. However, the fight was rescheduled and eventually took place on April 16, 2021 at Bellator 257. Budd won the bout via split decision and became a free agent after fighting out her contract.

Professional Fighters League 
On September 29, 2021, news surfaced that Budd had signed with Professional Fighters League and made her debut against Kaitlin Young on October 27, 2021 at PFL 10. She won the bout in decisive fashion via unanimous decision.

2022 season 
Budd faced Genah Fabian on May 6, 2022 at PFL 3. At weigh-ins, Fabian missed weight for her bout, weighing in at 160.8 pounds, 4.8 pounds over the lightweight non-title fight limit.  She was fined 20 percent of her purse, ineligible to win playoff points, given a walkover loss, and was penalized one point in the standings. Budd received a walkover win regardless of bout outcome but was eligible to gain stoppage points. She lost the bout via unanimous decision.

Budd was scheduled to face Kayla Harrison on July 1, 2022 at PFL 6. However, a week before the event, Budd pulled out due to injury.

Budd faced Aspen Ladd on November 25, 2022 at PFL 10. She lost the bout via split decision.

2023 season 
Budd will start of the 2023 season against Larissa Pacheco on April 7, 2023 at PFL 2.

Personal life
Budd is married to former MMA fighter Lance Gibson and step-mother of current Bellator lightweight fighter Lance Gibson Jr.

Championships and accomplishments
Bellator MMA
Bellator Women's Featherweight World Championship (one time; first; former)
Three successful title defenses
Tied (with Arlene Blencowe) for most fights in Bellator Women's Featherweight division history (10)
Most victories in Bellator Women's Featherweight division history (nine)

Mixed martial arts record

|-
| Loss
| align=center|16–5
|Aspen Ladd
|Decision (split)
|PFL 10
|
|align=center|3
|align=center|5:00
|New York City, New York, United States
|
|-
| Loss
| align=center|16–4
|Genah Fabian
|Decision (unanimous)
|PFL 3
|
|align=center|3
|align=center|5:00
|Arlington, Texas, United States
|
|-
|Win
|align=center|16–3 
|Kaitlin Young
|Decision (unanimous)
|PFL 10
|
|align=center|3
|align=center|5:00
|Hollywood, Florida, United States
|
|-
|Win
|align=center|15–3 
|Dayana Silva
|Decision (split)
|Bellator 257
|
|align=center|3
|align=center|5:00
|Uncasville, Connecticut, United States 
|
|-
|Win
|align=center|14–3
|Jessy Miele
|Decision (unanimous)
|Bellator 244 
|
|align=center|3
|align=center|5:00
|Uncasville, Connecticut, United States 
|
|-
| Loss
| align=center| 13–3
| Cris Cyborg
| TKO (punches)
|Bellator 238
| 
| align=center| 4
| align=center| 1:14
| Inglewood, California, United States
|
|-
|Win
|align=center|13–2
|Olga Rubin
|TKO (body kick and punches)
|Bellator 224
|
|align=center|1
|align=center|2:14
|Thackerville, Oklahoma, United States
|
|-
| Win
| align=center| 12–2
| Talita Nogueira
| TKO (punches)
| Bellator 202
| 
| align=center| 3
| align=center| 4:07
| Thackerville, Oklahoma, United States
| 
|-
| Win
| align=center| 11–2
| Arlene Blencowe
| Decision (split)
| Bellator 189
| 
| align=center| 5
| align=center| 5:00
| Thackerville, Oklahoma, United States
| 
|-
| Win
| align=center| 10–2
| Marloes Coenen
| TKO (punches)
| Bellator 174
| 
| align=center| 4
| align=center| 2:42
| Thackerville, Oklahoma, United States
| 
|-
| Win
| align=center| 9–2
| Arlene Blencowe
| Decision (majority)
| Bellator 162
| 
| align=center| 3
| align=center| 5:00
| Memphis, Tennessee, United States
| 
|-
| Win
| align=center| 8–2
| Roberta Rovel
| Decision (unanimous)
| Bellator 146
| 
| align=center| 3
| align=center| 5:00
| Thackerville, Oklahoma, United States
| 
|-
| Win
| align=center| 7–2
| Gabrielle Holloway
| Decision (unanimous)
| Bellator 133
| 
| align=center| 3
| align=center| 5:00
| Fresno, California, United States
| 
|-
| Win
| align=center| 6–2
| Charmaine Tweet
| Decision (unanimous)
| Invicta FC: Honchak vs. Smith
| 
| align=center| 3
| align=center| 5:00
| Kansas City, Missouri, United States
| 
|-
| Win
| align=center| 5–2
| Mollie Estes
| Submission (rear-naked choke)
| Invicta FC: Penne vs. Waterson
| 
| align=center| 3
| align=center| 1:04
| Kansas City, Missouri, United States
| 
|-
| Win
| align=center| 4–2
| Danielle West
| TKO (elbows and punches)
| Invicta FC: Penne vs. Sugiyama
| 
| align=center| 1
| align=center| 2:32
| Kansas City, Kansas, United States
| 
|-
| Win
| align=center| 3–2
| Elina Nilsson
| TKO (punches and elbows)
| Invicta FC: Baszler vs. McMann
| 
| align=center| 1
| align=center| 3:49
| Kansas City, Kansas, United States
| 
|-
| Loss
| align=center| 2–2
| Ronda Rousey
| Submission (armbar)
| Strikeforce Challengers: Britt vs. Sayers
| 
| align=center| 1
| align=center| 0:39
| Las Vegas, Nevada, United States
| 
|-
| Win
| align=center| 2–1
| Germaine de Randamie
| Decision (unanimous)
| Strikeforce Challengers: Fodor vs. Terry
| 
| align=center| 3
| align=center| 5:00
| Kent, Washington, United States
| 
|-
| Loss
| align=center| 1–1
| Amanda Nunes
| KO (punches)
| Strikeforce Challengers: Woodley vs. Saffiedine
| 
| align=center| 1
| align=center| 0:14
| Nashville, Tennessee, United States
| 
|-
| Win
| align=center| 1–0
| Shana Nelson
| TKO (punches)
| Strikeforce Challengers: Bowling vs. Voelker
| 
| align=center| 2
| align=center| 2:51
| Fresno, California, United States
|

Kickboxing record

|-
|-  bgcolor="#FFBBBB"
| 2008-05-03 || Loss ||align=left| Germaine de Randamie || Next Generation Warriors || Utrecht, Netherlands || TKO (punches) || 1 || 1:57 || 10–2
|-
|-  bgcolor="#CCFFCC"
| 2007-00-00 || Win ||align=left| Nop || Bangla Stadium || Phuket, Thailand || KO (knee) || 1 || || 10–1
|-
|-  bgcolor="#CCFFCC"
| 2007-05-12 || Win ||align=left| Natalie Fuz || Shindo Kumate 12 || Tampa, Florida, US || Decision (unanimous) || 3 || 3:00 || 9–1
|-
|-  bgcolor="#CCFFCC"
| 2006-12-08 || Win ||align=left| Chrisanne Roseliep || Shindo Kumate || Tampa, Florida, US || Decision (split) || 3 || 3:00 || 8–1
|-
|-  bgcolor="#CCFFCC"
| 0000-00-00 || Win ||align=left| Kayla Drane || || || TKO ||4  || || 7–1
|-
|-  bgcolor="#CCFFCC"
| 2006-04-00 || Win ||align=left| Lindsay Ball || || Vancouver, British Columbia, Canada || Decision (split) || || || 6–1
|-
|-  bgcolor="#CCFFCC"
| 2005-06-04 || Win ||align=left| Keri Scarr || King of Gladiators || Calgary, Alberta, Canada || Decision || || || 5–1
|-
|-  bgcolor="#CCFFCC"
| 2005-03-00 || Win ||align=left| Gina Carano || || || Decision || || || 4–1
|-
|-  bgcolor="#CCFFCC"
| 0000-00-00 || Win ||align=left| Jodi Hensel || || || Decision || || || 3–1
|-
|-  bgcolor="#CCFFCC"
| 0000-00-00 || Win ||align=left| Vanessa Parente || || || TKO || 4 || || 2–1
|-
|-  bgcolor="#CCFFCC"
| 0000-00-00 || Win ||align=left| Brenna Shaw || || || KO || 2 || || 1–1
|-
|-  bgcolor="#FFBBBB"
| 0000-00-00 || Loss ||align=left| Danielle Quee || || || || || || 0–1
|-
|-
| colspan=9 | Legend:

See also
 List of current PFL fighters
 List of female kickboxers
 List of female mixed martial artists

References

External links
 
 Julia Budd at Awakening Fighters
 

1983 births
Living people
Canadian female mixed martial artists
Canadian female kickboxers
Featherweight mixed martial artists
Mixed martial artists utilizing pankration
Mixed martial artists utilizing Muay Thai
Mixed martial artists utilizing kickboxing
Female Muay Thai practitioners
Canadian Muay Thai practitioners
Bellator MMA champions
Bellator female fighters